Zagut is a crater located in the heavily impacted southeast sector of the Moon. It is almost surrounded by other named craters, with Wilkins to the northwest, Lindenau to the east, Rabbi Levi in the southeast, and Celsius to the southwest. It is named after Jewish Spanish astronomer and rabbi Abraham Zacuto.

The rim of Zagut is worn and irregular, especially to the north and east. The east rim is overlain by Zagut E, a crater with an irregular and flat floor. The floor of Zagut itself is also relatively flat, and the center is occupied by the crater Zagut A instead of a peak.

Satellite craters

By convention these features are identified on lunar maps by placing the letter on the side of the crater midpoint that is closest to Zagut.

References

 
 
 
 
 
 
 
 
 
 
 

Impact craters on the Moon